Velleia rosea (pink velleia) is a species in the family Goodeniaceae that is native to Western Australia and flowers from April to October.

Description
Its bracteoles are hairy, with simple hairs. The calyx is lobed with sparse glandular hairs and of length . It is sparsely hairy on the outside and smooth on the inside. The anthers are free and the ovary is superior, containing more than two ovules.

Ecology
It grows in sandy or loamy soils.

Distribution
It occurs in the IBRA regions of Yalgoo (YAL), Murchison (MUR), Great Victoria Desert (GVD), Coolgardie (COO), Carnarvon (CAR), Gascoyne (GAS), Nullarbor (NUL), Geraldton Sandplains (GS) and Avon Wheatbelt (AW).

References

External links 
  Occurrence data for Velleia rosea from The Australasian Virtual Herbarium
 Flickr images of Velleia rosea

rosea
Endemic flora of Western Australia